Slot A is the physical and electrical specification for a 242-lead single-edge-connector used by early versions of AMD's Athlon processor.

The Slot A connector allows for a higher bus rate than Socket 7 or Super Socket 7. Slot A motherboards use the EV6 bus protocol, a technology originally developed by Digital Equipment Corporation (DEC) for its Alpha 21264 microprocessor.

Slot A is mechanically compatible but electrically incompatible with Intel's Slot 1.  As a consequence, Slot A motherboards were designed to have the connector's installed orientation be rotated 180 degrees relative to Slot 1 motherboards to discourage accidental insertion of a Slot 1 processor into a Slot A motherboard, and vice versa. The choice to use the same mechanical connector as the Intel Slot 1 also allowed motherboard manufacturers to keep costs down by stocking the same part for both Slot 1 and Slot A assemblies.  

Slot A was superseded by Socket A.

See also
 List of AMD microprocessors

References

AMD sockets